The Little Ding-Dong Science Theme Park is a theme park in Xinfeng Township, Hsinchu County, Taiwan. It is the only outdoor natural science park in Taiwan aimed to promote scientific knowledge and creative thoughts in children.

History
The theme park was opened in 1979.

Architecture
The theme park spans over an area of 30 hectares. The park is divided into eight main sections with more than 30 fun activities, with some revolve around water.

Transportation
The park is accessible within walking distance west from Xinfeng Station of Taiwan Railways.

See also
 List of tourist attractions in Taiwan

References

External links

 

1979 establishments in Taiwan
Amusement parks in Hsinchu County
Amusement parks opened in 1979
Science centers in Taiwan